Paddy Sheriff (15 October 1926 – 27 November 1990) was an Irish basketball player. He competed in the men's tournament at the 1948 Summer Olympics.

References

External links
 

1926 births
1990 deaths
Irish men's basketball players
Olympic basketball players of Ireland
Basketball players at the 1948 Summer Olympics
Sportspeople from Dublin (city)
Road incident deaths in the Republic of Ireland